Mapunda is a surname. Notable people with the surname include:

Bertram Mapunda (born 1957), Tanzanian archaeometallurgist and academic 
Emmanuel Mapunda (1935–2019), Tanzanian Roman Catholic bishop
Ivo Mapunda (born 1984), Tanzanian footballer
Nadia Mapunda (born 1988), Australian netball player
Nasibu Mapunda (born 1991), Tanzanian cricketer

Bantu-language surnames